Ropalidiini is a tribe of social wasps inhabiting the Afrotropical, Indomalayan and Australasian biogeographical regions.

Genera and selected species 
Belonogaster
Belonogaster juncea (Fabricius, 1781)
Belonogaster petiolata (Degeer, 1778)
Icaria
Parapolybia
Polybioides
Polybioides raphigastra (Saussure, 1854)
Polybioides tabidus (Fabricius, 1781)
Ropalidia
Ropalidia marginata 
Ropalidia ornaticeps 
Ropalidia plebeiana 
Ropalidia revolutionalis 
Ropalidia romandi

External links

Vespidae